Armco Park Mound II is a registered historic site near Otterbein, Ohio, United States, listed in the National Register on 29 May 1975.

Historic uses 
Graves/burials

See also
 List of Registered Historic Places in Warren County, Ohio* List of burial mounds in the United States

References 

National Register of Historic Places in Warren County, Ohio
Archaeological sites on the National Register of Historic Places in Ohio
Geography of Warren County, Ohio
Mounds in Ohio